The Oark School—Methodist Church is a historic church at the junction of Arkansas Highway 215 and County Road 34 in Oark, Arkansas.  It is a rectangular single-story wood-frame structure, with a gabled roof, novelty siding, and a fieldstone foundation.  The gable ends of the roof are adorned with large knee brackets.  Originally built c. 1923 as a collaboration between the local Methodist congregation and the school district, it served as both a public school and Methodist academy, the latter for a single season.  It was used as a public school until 1938, when the district was consolidated with other area districts.  It was briefly used as a school again in the 1950s, after the existing school burned down.  It is now used as a community meeting hall.

The building was listed on the National Register of Historic Places in 1995.

See also
National Register of Historic Places listings in Johnson County, Arkansas

References

Methodist churches in Arkansas
Churches on the National Register of Historic Places in Arkansas
Churches completed in 1923
Churches in Johnson County, Arkansas
National Register of Historic Places in Johnson County, Arkansas